The Tamar Valley Line is a railway line from Plymouth, Devon, to Gunnislake, Cornwall, in England, also known as the Gunnislake branch line. The line follows the River Tamar for much of its route. Like all railway lines in Devon and Cornwall, it is unelectrified and all trains are diesel powered. The entire line is single track past St. Budeaux Junction.

History
The line from St Budeaux to Bere Alston was opened for passenger traffic on 2 June 1890 by the Plymouth, Devonport and South Western Junction Railway (PDSWJ) as part of their line from Lydford to Devonport, which in effect was an extension of the London and South Western Railway's main line from London Waterloo station to Lydford, enabling the LSWR to reach Plymouth independently of the Great Western Railway.

The branch to Gunnislake was opened by the PDSWJ on 2 March 1908.

The line was listed for closure in the Reshaping of British Railways Report but was kept open (apart from the section between Gunnislake and Callington – closed in November 1966) because the roads in the areas served were poor.

Motive power
The line used former LSWR O2 Class tank engines as the main form of motive power for many years but in the 1950s newer LMS Ivatt Class 2 2-6-2T engines took over. By 1964 steam had been ousted from the line and DMUs had taken over, working as two-car sets.

Today services are operated by Great Western Railway using Class 150 diesel multiple units.

Route

Communities served: Plymouth (including the suburbs of Devonport and St Budeaux) – Bere Ferrers – Bere Alston – Calstock – Gunnislake

Trains heading towards Gunnislake must collect the branch train staff from a secure cabinet on the platform at  before proceeding as the line is operated on the one train working system with only a single unit allowed on the branch at a time. Conversely the staff has to be returned to the cabinet by the driver on the return journey before the unit can leave the branch and return to Plymouth. This operation was shown in an episode of the Channel 5 documentary series "The Railway - First Great Western" in October 2013.

There is a small railway museum adjacent to Bere Ferrers railway station which includes a number of converted rail coaches available for holiday let. The station sign on the signal box uses the older spelling of 'Beer Ferrers'.

The section between Bere Ferrers and Calstock Viaduct is on the Bere peninsula, between river Tavy (crossed by the Tavy Bridge) and the river Tamar.

The most southerly road bridge across the Tamar in the Gunnislake area is the A390 road which makes the railway is the quickest way of getting into the city of Plymouth. The next crossing down river is the Tamar Bridge at Saltash.

Passenger volume
The overall number of passengers travelling on the Tamar Valley line has grown by over 50% since 2001. Gunnislake is the busiest station on the line.

Community rail
The Tamar Valley Line is one of the railway lines supported by the Devon and Cornwall Rail Partnership, an organisation formed in 1991 to promote railway services in the area. The line is promoted by many means such as regular timetable and scenic line guides, as well as leaflets highlighting leisure opportunities such as walking or visiting country pubs.

The Tamar Valley rail ale trail was launched in 2004 to encourage rail travellers to visit pubs near the line.  Seven are in Plymouth city centre and one in the suburb of Devonport.  There are single pubs to visit at Bere Ferrers, Bere Alston and Calstock and four in Gunnislake. 10 stamps collected entitle the participant to claim special Tamar Valley Line Rail Trail souvenir merchandise.

Wessex Trains covered Class 150 2-car DMU number 150240 in coloured pictures promoting the line and named The Tamar Kingfisher. It later saw service with Arriva Trains Wales.

The line was designated as a community rail line in September 2005, being one of seven pilots for the Department for Transport's Community Rail Development Strategy.  This aims to establish the true costs and revenues for the line with an aim of improving them.  It is also looking at simplifying the reversal of trains, considering the costs and benefits should the line be "microfranchised" separately from the Great Western Franchise, and the potential for extending the line from Bere Alston to Tavistock.

On 18 March 2008, Devon County Council backed a proposal by developers Kilbride Community Rail to construct 750 houses in Tavistock that includes reopening the  line from Bere Alston to a new Tavistock railway station, at a cost of £18.5million.

References

External links
Great Scenic Railways in Devon and Cornwall.
Calstock Online Parish Clerk – Railway pages
Video footage of Gunnislake station
Calstock Railway Station video
Calstock Railway Viaduct
Bere Alston Railway Station

Rail transport in Cornwall
Rail transport in Devon
Scenic railway lines in Devon and Cornwall
Community railway lines in England
Transport in Plymouth, Devon
Railway lines opened in 1890
Railway lines in South West England
Standard gauge railways in England
River Tamar
1890 establishments in England